Nematops is a genus of righteye flounders native to the Indo-West Pacific. Due to their small size (up to ) and depth of habitation (up to ) few examples of this genus are caught, and as a result little is known of their morphology and distribution.

Species
There are currently four recognized species in this genus:
 Nematops grandisquama Weber & de Beaufort, 1929 (Large-scale righteye flounder)
 Nematops macrochirus Norman, 1931 (Narrow-body righteye flounder)
 Nematops microstoma Günther, 1880 (Small-mouth righteye flounder)
 Nematops nanosquama Amaoka, Kawai & Séret, 2006

References

 
Pleuronectidae
Taxa named by Albert Günther
Marine fish genera